Chelsea Morgan Krost (born February 2, 1991) is an American speaker, author, television and radio talk-show host, executive producer, health coach, and entrepreneur.

Career

Radio 

From 2008 through 2011, Krost wrote and produced Teen Talk Live, a teen-oriented radio show on WBZT 1230 AM, Palm Beaches' Talk Station, Boca Raton, Florida. Themed "Our Voice, Our Opinion, Our Time to Talk", Krost discussed subject matter specific to the teenagers of her generation.

In 2012, the show was renamed to The Chelsea Krost Radio Show, when the first episode for the re-branded show was produced and aired in November on Blog Talk Radio.

Television 

Krost has appeared as a guest contributor for television news shows, commenting on social issues faced by the Millennial Generation. She has appeared as a contributing expert for local affiliates across all major networks, such as CBS Miami, CBS Los Angeles, ABC 13, FOX News stations, commenting on a variety of topics from bullying, drug abuse, and sex, to Job Hunting skills, Financial Management for the Millennial age, and fashion and technology trends.

Krost appeared on NBC's Today Show with Kathie Lee & Hoda, Good Morning America, The Meredith Vieira Show, The Home and Family Show, Bloomberg TV She has made appearances on Anderson Live.

In 2013, Philadelphia broadcast television station WMCN and national production company, Studio City, launched The Chelsea Krost Show, a talk-show platform discussing trends, issues and the culture of the Millennial Generation, and aired eight episodes from May through June 2013. This concept show pre-dated other shows, including Raising McCain.

Online media 

She is a regular contributor to Life, Love & Shopping, a subsidiary of The daily buzz. 
Krost is also a contributor for online programming including Answers.com, Galtime.com. She is also a regular contributing blogger for Intel for Change, as well as being a commentator for MasterCard.

Krost is the host of  #MillennialTalk Twitter Chat which generates up to 45 million impressions.

Print media 
In 2011, Krost published A Reflection of My Teenage Experience in an Extraordinary Life. It was released by Jacquie Jordan Inc Publishing.

In June 2011 and 2012, Krost co-produced and hosted the New York City Women's Empowerment Summit with VIP Talent Connect. Offering color commentary in print and online, Krost discussed the details of this one-day conference. During Advertising Week in September 2013, in New York City, Krost served as a contributing panelist for Cosmopolitan Magazine's marketing to millennials break-out session called, "Miss-Perception: Disrupting Millennial Myths and Stereotypes".

Spokesperson and philanthropy 

Chelsea sat on the board of Cosmopolitan Magazine as a Millennial board member and has promoted many notable brands such as Intel and MasterCard.

In 2009, Krost became a spokesperson for U by Kotex, publishing six blogs for the organization from January 2010 through October 2013 on a variety of subjects about gynecological education and well-being. As U by Kotex spokesperson, Krost traveled to Nairobi, Africa in 2009 to educate young women about sanitary hygiene products and the importance of staying in school. She delivered feminine hygiene products to the HEART Freedom for Girls Program and the Nyumbani Children's Home. The 10-day journey was documented for CBS and Fox News affiliates in Florida through a four-part special called "Mission to Africa." Since then, Krost has been a part of mission trips to Peru, Joplin Missouri, and South Africa serving an educational role for young women. In addition, she volunteers her time with SOS Children's Villages, Girls for a Change, The Unicorn Foundation, Africa Heart, and Dream Sponsors, Inc.

References

External links 
Chelsea Krost's Website

American radio personalities
1991 births
Living people
People from Long Island